In Finland, girls named Milja has name day (Nimipäivä) on the second Wednesday in November.

Milja is a given name. Notable people with the name include:

 Milja Hellsten (born 1990), Finnish curler
 Milja Salovaara (born 1972), Finnish costume designer, scenographer and set designer
 Milja Simonsen (born 1997), Faroese football forward

References 
 http://www.norskenavn.no/navn.php?id=11183